A marotte is a prop stick used by jesters.

Marotte may also refer to:

People 
 Carl Marotte (born 1959), Canadian actor
 Gilles Marotte (1945–2005), Canadian hockey player
 Ginette Marotte, Canadian politician
 Maxime Marotte (born 1986), French mountain bike racer

Other uses 
 Marotte, Ouest, Haiti